"Every Time You Touch Me (I Get High)" is the title track from the 1975 album by Charlie Rich.  The song was written by Rich and Billy Sherrill and peaked at number three on the country chart.  "Every Time You Touch Me (I Get High)" also peaked at number nineteen on the Billboard Hot 100 and fared better on the Easy Listening chart where it spent one week at number one.

Charts

Weekly charts

Year-end charts

References

1975 songs
1975 singles
Charlie Rich songs
Songs written by Billy Sherrill
Song recordings produced by Billy Sherrill
Epic Records singles
Songs written by Charlie Rich